The 1973 Derby Borough Council election took place on 7 June 1973 to elect members of Derby Borough Council in England. This was on the same day as other local elections. Voting took place across 18 wards, each electing 3 Councillors. Following the Local Government Act 1972, this was the first election to the new non-metropolitan district council for Derby, which came into being on 1 April the following year. The Labour Party took control of the Council after winning a majority of seats.

Overall results

|-
| colspan=2 style="text-align: right; margin-right: 1em" | Total
| style="text-align: right;" | 54
| colspan=5 |
| style="text-align: right;" | 42,441
| style="text-align: right;" |

Ward results

Abbey

Allestree

Alvaston

Arboretum

Babington

Breadsall

Chaddesden

Chellaston

Darley

Derwent

Friar Gate

Litchurch

Littleover

Mickleover

Normanton

Osmanton

Pear Tree

Spondon

References

1973 English local elections
June 1973 events in the United Kingdom
1973
1970s in Derbyshire